This is a complete list of Whitney Biennial curators who have curated or are scheduled to curate the Whitney Biennial exhibitions at the Whitney Museum of American Art in New York City, United States. The Whitney Biennial began as an annual exhibition in 1932, the first biennial was in 1973.

History
The Whitney Museum had a long history beginning in 1932 of having a large group exhibition of invited American artists every year called the 'Whitney Annual'. In the late sixties, it was decided to alternate between painting and sculpture, although by the 1970s the decision was to combine both together in a biennial. The first biennial was curated by a curatorial committee under direction of director John I. H. Baur. The 1975 Whitney Biennial, the first to credit curators with the show curation, acknowledged the five person curatorial team of John Hanhardt, Barbara Haskell, James Monte, Elke Solomon, and Marcia Tucker. The catalog additionally acknowledges how the curators' work was co-supported by a grant from the National Endowment for the Arts.

Whitney Biennial Curators

See also
List of Whitney Biennial artists

References

Visual arts awards
Whitney Museum of American Art
Cultural heritage of the United States
Art curators
American art
Art exhibitions in the United States
People associated with the Whitney Museum of American Art
Curators